Valley School may refer to:

The Valley School, India
Valley High School (West Des Moines, Iowa)
Valley School (Orderville, Utah), listed on the NRHP in Kane County, Utah